Clowns is an Australian punk rock band. They formed in Melbourne in 2009. Throughout multiple lineup changes they released albums in 2013, *I'm Not Right, 2015, Bad Blood, 2017, Lucid Again and 2019, Nature / Nurture.

Their fourth album, Nature / Nurture, saw them nominated for the 2019 ARIA Award for Best Hard Rock or Heavy Metal Album.

Members
Stevie Williams – vocals
Jake Laderman – drums
Jarrod Goon – guitar
Cam Rust – guitar
Hanny Tilbrook – bass/vocals

Discography
I'm Not Right (2013) – Poison City Records
Bad Blood (2015) – Poison City Records
Lucid Again (2017) – This Charming Man Records
Nature/Nurture (2019) – Damaged Records

References 

Musical groups from Melbourne